The Developing Economies is a quarterly peer-reviewed academic journal covering developing countries' social science by applying empirical and comparative studies. It is also the official journal of the Institute of Developing Economies. The journal was published semi-annually from 1963 to 1967.

Abstracting and indexing 
The Developing Economies is abstracted and indexed by the following services:
CAB Direct 
Current Contents/Social & Behavioral Sciences
GEOBASE
Scopus
Social Sciences Citation Index

According to the Journal Citation Reports, the journal has a 2015 impact factor of 0.517, ranking it 47th out of 55 journals in the category "Planning & Development" and 250th out of 344 journals in the category "Economics".

See also
The World Economy (journal)

References

Wiley-Blackwell academic journals
Economics journals
English-language journals
Publications established in 1963
Quarterly journals
Development economics
Development studies journals